The 1980 season was the Chicago Bears' 61st in the National Football League, and their third under head coach Neill Armstrong. The team failed to improve from their 10–6 record from 1979 to finish at 7–9, and failed to make the playoffs for the first time since 1978.

One of the seven victories by the Bears that year was a Thanksgiving game against the Detroit Lions. With no time left in regulation, Bears quarterback Vince Evans scored a game-tying touchdown that sent the game into overtime. Then, before a national television audience, Dave Williams returned a kickoff 95 yards for a touchdown on the first play of overtime and a 23–17 victory in overtime over the Lions.

Walter Payton once again led the NFC in rushing for the fifth straight year with 1,460 yards.

Offseason

Draft

Roster

Schedule

Season summary

Week 1: at Green Bay Packers

Week 2

Week 3

Week 4

Week 5

Week 6

Week 7

Week 8

Week 9

Week 10

Week 11

Week 12

Week 13

Week 14

Week 15

Week 16

Standings

References 

Chicago Bears
Chicago Bears seasons
Chicago